The following are the events in professional sumo during 1994.

Tournaments

Hatsu basho
Ryōgoku Kokugikan, Tokyo, 9 January – 23 January

Haru basho
Osaka Prefectural Gymnasium, Osaka, 13 March – 27 March

Natsu basho
Ryōgoku Kokugikan, Tokyo,  8 May – 22 May

Nagoya basho
Aichi Prefectural Gymnasium, Nagoya, 3 July – 17 July

Aki basho
Ryōgoku Kokugikan, Tokyo, 11 September – 25 September

Kyushu basho
Fukuoka International Centre, Kyushu, 6 November – 20 November

News

January
Ōzeki Takanohana wins his fourth top division yūshō with a 14–1 score. Second and third are sekiwake Takanonami on 13–2 and Musashimaru on 12–3, who both earn promotion to ozeki after the tournament. Takanonami wins the Fighting Spirit prize, and Musashimaru the Technique Award. Musōyama wins the Outstanding Performance prize. Sekiwake Konishiki, demoted from ōzeki after six years in the previous tourney, fails in his attempt to return to the rank after turning in a disastrous 2–13 score. Naminohana wins the jūryō championship. Former maegashira Tachihikari retires.

March
Yokozuna Akebono wins his seventh championship after a three-way playoff with Takanonami, in his ōzeki debut, and maegashira 12 Takatōriki, after all finish  on 12–3. Takanohana is one behind on 11–4. Takatōriki is awarded the Fighting Spirit Prize, shared with Terao. Kaiō wins the Outstanding Performance Prize for his defeat of Akebono, while the Technique Award is shared between Kotonishiki and Oginishiki. Shikishima wins the jūryō championship.

May
Takahanada wins his fifth championship with a 14–1 score. Musashimaru is runner-up two wins behind on 12–3. Akebono is forced to withdraw after injuring his knee in a match with Takatoriki. Terao scores eight wins on his return to the san'yaku ranks and receives the Outstanding Performance prize. Mainoumi wins his fourth Technique Prize, and Takatōriki his fifth Fighting Spirit Award. Former maegashira Oginohana wins his third jūryō championship.

July
Musashimaru wins his first championship with a perfect 15–0 score – the first wrestler to remain unbeaten in the top division since Chiyonofuji in 1989. Fellow ōzeki Wakanohana loses only to Musashimaru and is runner-up on 14–1. Takanohana fails again in his yokozuna promotion attempt, scoring only 11–4. Akebono is out injured. Takatōriki wins his third consecutive Fighting Spirit Award after scoring 10–5 at komusubi, and Mainoumi wins his second Technique prize in a row. Hamanoshima wins the Outstanding Performance Award, and both he and Mainoumi are promoted to komusubi for the first time. The jūryō championship is won by Tatsuhikari. Enazakura retires.

September
Takanohana wins the championship, unbeaten on 15–0. Runner-up is sekiwake Musōyama on 13–2, who receives special prizes for Outstanding Performance (shared with Kotoinazuma) and Fighting Spirit. Akebono is out once again. Naminohana wins the jūryō championship for the second time this year.

November
Takanohana wins the championship with his second successive unbeaten score, compiling a three tournament record of 41–4. After the tournament he is promoted to yokozuna, the first Japanese to hold the rank since Hokutoumi in 1992. Despite being held at the ōzeki rank for nearly two years, he is still the third youngest yokozuna in history after Kitanoumi and Taihō. Musashimaru finishes runner-up on 12–3, while Akebono scores ten on his return. Only one special prize is awarded, to Naminohana for Fighting Spirit. Wakashoyo wins the jūryō championship after a playoff with newcomer Tosanoumi. Former maegashira Hananokuni retires.

Deaths
9 Nov: Former maegashira Azumanishiki, aged 54.
22 Dec: Former maegashira Nachinoyama, also former Minezaki Oyakata, aged 74.
24 Dec: Former maegashira Nanatsuumi, aged 67.

See also
Glossary of sumo terms
List of past sumo wrestlers
List of years in sumo
List of yokozuna

Sumo by year
Sumo